Omega Sagittarii, which is Latinized from ω Sagittarii, is a binary star system in the constellation of Sagittarius, near the eastern constellation border with Capricornus. It is formally named Terebellum . This system has a yellow hue and is faintly visible to the naked eye with an apparent visual magnitude of 4.70. It is located at a distance of 76 light years away from the Sun based on parallax, and is drifting closer with a radial velocity of −16 km/s. The position of this star near the ecliptic means it is subject to lunar occultations.

The visible component is a G-type subgiant star with a stellar classification of G5 IV. It is three billion years old and is spinning with a projected rotational velocity of 5.6 km/s. The star is radiating seven times the luminosity of the Sun from its photosphere at an effective temperature of 5,499 K.

Nomenclature 

ω Sagittarii (Latinised to Omega Sagittarii) is the star's Bayer designation.

This star, together with 60, 62 and 59 Sagittarii, formed the asterism called Terebellum. According to a 1971 NASA memorandum, Terebellum was originally the title for four stars: Omega Sagittarii as Terebellum I, 59 Sagittarii as Terebellum II, 60 Sagittarii as Terebellum III and 62 Sagittarii as Terebellum IV . In 2016, the IAU organized a Working Group on Star Names (WGSN) to catalog and standardize proper names for stars. The WGSN approved the name Terebellum for Omega Sagittarii on 5 September 2017 and it is now so included in the List of IAU-approved Star Names.

References

G-type subgiants
Astrometric binaries

Sagittarius (constellation)
Sagittarii, Omega
PD-26 06880
Sagittarii, 58
Gliese and GJ objects
188376
098066
7597